The 2009 Magyar Kupa, known as  for sponsorship reasons, is the 83rd edition of the tournament.

Quarter-finals

Quarter-final matches were played on 3 and 4 October 2009.

|}

Final four
The final four will be held on 21 and 22 November 2009 at the Szőnyi úti uszoda in Budapest.

Semi-finals

Final

See also
 2009–10 Országos Bajnokság I

External links
 Hungarian Water Polo Federaration 

Seasons in Hungarian water polo competitions
Hungary
Magyar Kupa